The 1932–33 Serie A season was the seventh season of the Serie A, the top level of ice hockey in Italy. Hockey Club Milano won the championship by defeating SG Cortina in the final.

Qualification

Western Group

Semifinals
Hockey Club Milano II - Valentino Torino 11-0
Hockey Club Milano - Excelsior Milano 12-1

Final
Hockey Club Milano proceeded to the final-qualification, as they would've played their against their second team in the Western final.

Eastern Group
Oritsei - HC Bolzano 0-5

Final-Qualification
Hockey Club Milano - HC Bolzano 11:0

Final
Hockey Club Milano - SG Cortina (3-0, 5-0)

External links
 Season on hockeytime.net

1932–33 in Italian ice hockey
Serie A (ice hockey) seasons
Italy